Boogie's Gonna Getcha: '80s New York Boogie is a  compilation album in a BackBeats series released in 2010 on the Demon Music Group-sublabel BackBeats. The album was compiled by British music producer Ian Dewhirst and it was  released on CD and contains twelve original boogie and post-disco tracks. In the United States, most of the songs were either underground  and/or entered the Billboard Dance charts. However, in the United Kingdom it had some success especially on the pop chart, including  "On The One" (#72) and "Please Don't Break My Heart" (#77).
 
The album mainly features artists of the SAM Records label, namely Conversion, Komiko, Klassique, Glen Adams Affair, Vicky "D" and Rhyze.

Reception

The Allmusic review by Andy Kellman introduces the album: "Boogie's Gonna Getcha focuses on the electronics-enhanced post-disco R&B that came out of New York City during the early '80s" but states that "Back Beats digs a little deeper, but not so deep that even the keenest collectors lose interest."

Track listing

Personnel

"Share The Night" 
Year: 1983
Composers: Bernard Bullock, Douglas Pittman

"Please Don't Break My Heart" 
Year: 1985
Composers: John F. Adams, Van Gibbs

"Main Thing"
Year: 1986
Composer: Roger "Wolfie" Williams

"This Beat Is Mine" 
Year: 1982
Composer: André Booth

"Just How Sweet Is Your Love"
Year: 1980
Composers: Leon Stuckey, Paul Kyser

"Hold On" 
Year: 1982
Composer: Wayne Brathwaite

"Just A Groove"
Year: 1980
Composer: Glen Adams

"On The One"
Year: 1985
Composers:Ken Krasner, Lenny Underwood

"Rapper's Revenge"
Year: 1984
Composers: Leroy Burgess, Mike Goodhope

"Let's Do It"
Year: 1980
Composers: James Calloway, Leroy Burgess, Sonny T. Davenport

"Somebody's Loving You"
Year: 1983
Composer: Linda Kane

"Feel Alright"
Year: 1982
Composer: Nick Braddy

References

2010 compilation albums
Post-disco compilation albums
Boogie compilation albums